Saxon Switzerland-Eastern Ore Mountains is a district (Kreis) in Saxony, Germany. It is named after the mountain ranges Saxon Switzerland and Eastern Ore Mountains.

History 
The district was established by merging the former districts of Sächsische Schweiz and Weißeritzkreis as part of the district reform of August 2008.

Geography 

The district is located between Dresden and the Czech Republic. In the southwestern part of the district the easternmost part of the Ore Mountains (″Erzgebirge") is found, the southeastern part of the district is named Saxon Switzerland, which is part of the Elbe Sandstone Mountains. The main river of the district is the Elbe. The district borders (from the west and clockwise) the districts of Mittelsachsen and Meißen, the urban district Dresden, the district of Bautzen, and the Czech Republic.

Towns and municipalities 

{|
! colspan=2 align=left width=50%|Towns
! colspan=2 align=left width=50%|Municipalities
|- valign=top
||
Altenberg
Bad Gottleuba-Berggießhübel
Bad Schandau
Dippoldiswalde
Dohna
Freital
Glashütte
Heidenau
Hohnstein
Königstein
||
Liebstadt
Neustadt in Sachsen
Pirna
Rabenau
Sebnitz
Stadt Wehlen
Stolpen
Tharandt
Wilsdruff
||
Bahretal
Bannewitz
Dohma
Dorfhain
Dürrröhrsdorf-Dittersbach
Gohrisch
Hartmannsdorf-Reichenau
Hermsdorf
Klingenberg
||
Kreischa
Lohmen
Müglitztal
Rathen
Rathmannsdorf
Reinhardtsdorf-Schöna
Rosenthal-Bielatal
Struppen
|}

Transport
The district owns the Regionalverkehr Sächsische Schweiz-Osterzgebirge, a transport company that provides bus, ferry and tram services to the district.

See also
 Armorial of Sächsische Schweiz-Osterzgebirge

References

External links 

  (German)